Barham  is a village and civil parish in the City of Canterbury district of Kent, England.

History
The name Barham was spelt Bioraham in 799, from Biora (derived from Beora, a Saxon chief) and Ham ("settlement" or "homestead").

Just outside Barham stood the Black Mill, a windmill which was accidentally burnt down in 1970. Barham Downs Golf Club (now defunct) was founded in 1890. The club disappeared following the First World War.

Geography 
The land of the village is a mostly rural and wooded right-angled triangle of land (irregular in shape) commencing with the A2 road between Canterbury and Dover on its north-east border, with its housing grouped among wooded hills and pasture of the village. Elevations range between 138 feet (42m) in the north to 427 feet (130m) in the south-west. Barham Downs are wooded hills north-west of the village centre. The Nailbourne, a tributary of the Little Stour, rises in Lyminge and flows intermittently in line with the seasons and rainfall through the centre of the village.

At the north of the parish is the hamlet of Out Elmstead.

Community
Barham village has its own C of E primary school, and a village hall with bowls club attached. On The Street is the village green sports field, the Duke of Cumberland public house, and a care home. Parish Anglican religion is provided by the Church of St John the Baptist. Opposite the church on Church Lane is a farm complex, including barns for storage and services, which is the headquarters of a wine estate.

At Breach, to the west of Ellam Valley Road, is a vineyard with garden centre, pottery, and day care centre. To the east of the road are the light industrial, services and offices units of Barham Business Park.

Out Elmstead, the most residential of the three parish outliers in terms of the anciently named hamlets, contains a farm nursery. Access to the hamlet from the village is either from Valley Road, part of the main north-south road through the parish, or from the northbound side of the A2 which runs at the east of the parish.

At the southeast of the parish is Barham Crematorium, which opened in 1956. 

Barham parish is part of the Barham Downs electoral ward, which stretches north to Adisham, and has a total population taken at the 2011 Census of 2,797.

Landmarks
Broome Park, at the southeast of the parish, is a Grade I listed building dating to the 17th century; its park and gardens, occupying approximately a sixth of parish land, is Grade II listed in the initial category of the national grading system.

The Church of St John the Baptist is on Church Lane on the eastern hillside of the village. Built in the 14th century, it has a green copper spire, and has been partially remodelled inside.

At Out Elmstead are eight listed buildings.

Notable people 
David Starkey (1945–), historian
 Field Marshal Horatio Herbert Kitchener, 1st Earl Kitchener, Field Marshal, diplomat and statesman, lived the last few years of his life at Broome Park. His name appears on the war memorial in the porch of the parish church.
Reginald Fitz Urse – Knight to Henry II of England and one of four assassins of Thomas Becket.

References

External links

Further reading
 Learning to Look at Paintings by Mary Acton (Psychology Press, 1997)  discusses the demographics of Barham in the early 19th century

Villages in Kent
Civil parishes in Kent